William Sidney, 1st Viscount De L'Isle (1909–1991), was the Governor-General of Australia.

William Sidney may refer to:
William Sidney (MP for Sussex), MP for Sussex in 1429 and 1433
Sir William Sidney (1482?–1554), English courtier under Henry VIII and Edward VI
William Sidney, 5th Baron De L'Isle and Dudley, candidate in the 1944 Chelsea by-election

See also